The Green River  is a  tributary of the Ohio River that rises in Lincoln County in south-central Kentucky. Tributaries of the Green River include the Barren River, the Nolin River, the Pond River and the Rough River. The river was named after Nathanael Greene, a general of the American Revolutionary War.

History
Following the Revolutionary War, many veterans staked claims along the Green River as payment for their military service. The river valley also attracted several vagrants, earning it the dubious nickname Rogue's Harbor.

In 1842, the Green River was canalized, with a series of locks and dams being built to create a navigable channel as far inland as Bowling Green, Kentucky.  Four locks and dams were constructed on the Green River, and one lock and dam was built on the Barren River, a tributary that passed through Bowling Green.

During the American Civil War, Confederate General John Hunt Morgan conducted daring raids through the Green River country, from which he reached into southern Indiana and Ohio.

In 1901, two additional locks and dams were opened on the Green River, which allowed river traffic to Mammoth Cave. In 1941, Mammoth Cave National Park was established, and the two upper locks and dams closed in 1950.  In 1965, Lock and Dam #4 at Woodbury that locked both the Green and Barren rivers failed;.

In 1969, the United States Army Corps of Engineers impounded a section of the river, forming  Green River Lake. The lake is now the primary feature of Green River Lake State Park.

The Southern Cherokee Nation of Kentucky, an unrecognized tribe of persons claiming Cherokee ancestry, is located in Henderson County, near the lower Green River.

Route

The Green River flows through Mammoth Cave National Park, located along river miles 188 to 210. The heightened level of Green River probably kept the connection of Mammoth Cave and the nearby Flint Ridge Cave system underwater until a drought partially exposed it and made connection a reality, increasing the length of Mammoth Cave to over 360 miles in length. In 2017, multiple agencies along with the U.S. Army Corps of Engineers closed Green River Lock and Dam #6 and dismantled it after a hydraulic hole was discovered in the dam. Green River is now free-flowing throughout Mammoth Cave National Park though water levels are impacted by releases from Green River Lake upstream. This has allowed for increased canoeing and kayaking opportunities from Nolin Dam to Brownsville, and has added more land to the National Park on the west bank of Green River. The 2022 removal of Lock and Dam #5 near Reedyville will allow more opportunities for canoeing and kayaking along the river from Mammoth Cave to Rochester.

The  Green River, an important transportation artery for the coal industry, is open to traffic up to the closed Lock and Dam #3 (known as the Rochester Dam) at mile 108.5. In 2019, plans were underway at Lock and Dam #3 to repair the dam and potentially raise the slack water pool held behind it by as much as three feet. Muhlenberg County, once the largest coal-producing county in the nation, benefits greatly from access to the river, as does the aluminium industry in Henderson County. In 2002, more than 10 million short tons were shipped on the river, primarily sub-bituminous coal, petroleum coke, and aluminium ore.  

The river rises from Kings Mountain, Kentucky, and follows a meandering path, collecting several smaller streams along its way to its impoundment by a dam at Green River Lake near Campbellsville.  It then continues in a westerly direction and is joined by the Little Barren River before entering the Mammoth Cave National Park.  At the western end of the park, it receives the tributary Nolin River which exits Nolin River Lake. Then continuing westward it is joined by the Barren River.  It then takes a more northwesterly turn as it proceeds through western Kentucky.  The river provided cooling water for the TVA's now-shutdown Paradise Fossil Plant near Drakesboro, in Muhlenberg County. Near Sebree it provides coolant water for Robert Reed Power Station, a coal fired power plant, before it finally empties into the Ohio River at Spottsville.

Biology
The Green River is home to more than 150 fish species and more than 70 mussel species.  This includes some of Kentucky's largest fish and some of the world's rarest species of mussels.

Mussels
Endangered species:
Ring Pink Obovaria retusa
Rough Pigtoe Pleurobema plenum
Northern riffleshell Epioblasma torulosa rangiana 	

Threatened species:
Long solid Mussel Fusconaia subrotunda
Pink Mucket Lampsilis abrupta
Pyramid Pigtoe Pleurobema rubrum

See also

Green River Lake State Park
List of Kentucky rivers
List of crossings of the Green River
Mammoth Cave National Park
Southern Cherokee Nation of Kentucky

References

Further reading
The Ohio River – In American History and Voyaging on Today's River, with a section on the Green River; Heron Island Guides, 2007,

External links

Green
Tributaries of the Ohio River
Rivers of Butler County, Kentucky
Rivers of Casey County, Kentucky
Rivers of Daviess County, Kentucky
Rivers of Edmonson County, Kentucky
Rivers of Green County, Kentucky
Rivers of Hart County, Kentucky
Rivers of Henderson County, Kentucky
Rivers of Lincoln County, Kentucky
Rivers of McLean County, Kentucky
Rivers of Muhlenberg County, Kentucky
Rivers of Ohio County, Kentucky
Rivers of Taylor County, Kentucky
Rivers of Warren County, Kentucky
Rivers of Webster County, Kentucky